Black Brigade may refer to:

 Black Brigades, Fascist paramilitary groups operating in northern Italy during the final years of World War II, and after the signing of the Italian Armistice in 1943
 Certain Polish military units in World War II, including:
 10th Motorized Cavalry Brigade (Poland)
 10th Armoured Cavalry Brigade (Poland)
 1st Armoured Division (Poland)
Racially segregated military units in United States history, including:
 The Black Brigade, a 24-strong Loyalist military unit consisting largely of Black Loyalists, or formerly enslaved African Americans or who escaped to the British during the American Revolutionary War
 Black Brigade of Cincinnati, a military unit made up of African Americans organized during the Civil War to protect the city of Cincinnati in 1862

Fictional
 Black Brigade (film), the DVD release title of the 1970 television movie Carter's Army about a squad of all black troops charged with securing an important hydro dam in Nazi Germany

See also 
 Pitch Black Brigade, the second album by the Norwegian band Vreid
 The Black Order Brigade, a translation of the French graphic novel political thriller Les Phalanges de l'Ordre Noir by Pierre Christin